L'amore più bello (The most beautiful love, also known as L'uomo dai calzoni corti) is a 1958 Italian comedy-drama film directed by Glauco Pellegrini.

Plot 
Salvatore escapes from the orphanage of Caltanissetta to find the mother he never knew. Before finding her in Venice he will live several adventures in Naples, Rome and Milan.

Cast 
 : Salvatore D'Esposito
 Eduardo De Filippo: Gennaro
 Memmo Carotenuto: Nando
 Francisco Rabal: Mario
 Julia Martínez: Gina
 Irene Cefaro: Estella
 Alida Valli: Carolina

References

External links

1958 films
1950s road comedy-drama films
Films directed by Glauco Pellegrini
Films scored by Carlo Rustichelli
Films with screenplays by Ugo Pirro
Italian road comedy-drama films
1958 comedy films
1958 drama films
1950s Italian films